Mike Milligan may refer to:

 Mike Milligan (footballer) (born 1967), English former footballer of Irish descent
 Mike Milligan (coach) (1904–1979), American football and basketball coach
 Mike Milligan (character), a character in The Story of Tracy Beaker, Tracy Beaker Returns and The Dumping Ground